Jaye Cassandra Gardiner is an American cancer researcher at the Fox Chase Cancer Center. Her research considers the microenvironment that surrounds tumors, with a particular focus on pancreatic ductal adenocarcinoma. In 2022, she was the inaugural awardee of the Black in Cancer Postdoctoral Fellowship.

Early life and education 
Gardiner is a first generation American. She was a doctoral researcher at the University of Wisconsin–Madison, where she worked on HIV cell-to-cell transmission. She studied how the cytoplasmic tail of the envelope was involved with forming the virological synapse.

Research and career 
Gardiner is a postdoctoral fellow at the Fox Chase Cancer Center, where she works with Edna Cukierman. Her research considers the microenvironment that surrounds tumors, with a particular focus on pancreatic ductal adenocarcinoma. Pancreatic ductal adenocarcinoma has a survival rate of 10% and is one of the leading causes of cancer-related deaths. She believes that these microenivronments are critical to identify new diagnostic and therapeutic tools.

Gardiner founded JKX Comics, a project that looks to improve science literacy amongst young people. She is committed to improving diversity in science and engineering. She was appointed to the American Association for the Advancement of Science IF/THEN Ambassador, which looks to promote women scientists.

Awards and honors 
 2021 Black in Cancer Postdoctoral Fellowship
 2021 AAAS IF/THEN Ambassador
 2022 American Society for Cell Biology Merton Bernfield Memorial Award

Selected publications

References 

Living people
University of Wisconsin–Madison alumni
Macalester College alumni
Fox Chase Cancer Center people
21st-century American women scientists
Year of birth missing (living people)